Curiatius Maternus appears in the Dialogus de oratoribus (Dialogue on orators) of Tacitus.  He was an author of tragedies in Latin, having composed a Domitius, a Medea, and a Cato by AD 74 or 75. He may be identified with the sophist Maternus who was put to death by Domitian for speaking against tyrants in a practice speech, or with either Marcus Cornelius Nigrinus Curiatius Maternus suffect consul in 83 himself, or his adoptive father.

References
 Tacitus, Dialogus de oratoribus
 Dio Cassius, Roman History 67.12.5
 Tenney Frank. "Curiatius Maternus and His Tragedies," AJP 58 (1937) 225–229.
 Mario Erasmo. Roman Tragedy: Theatre to Theatricality'.   (University of Texas Press, 2004).

Ancient Roman tragic dramatists
Ancient Roman rhetoricians
1st-century Romans
Year of birth unknown
Year of death unknown
1st-century writers
Curiatii